Bílovice is a municipality and village in Uherské Hradiště District in the Zlín Region of the Czech Republic. It has about 1,900 inhabitants.

Administrative parts
The village of Včelary is an administrative part of Bílovice.

References

Villages in Uherské Hradiště District